Margaret Johnson MBE (born 2 May 1943) is a former Northern Irish lawn and indoor bowler.

Bowls career
Johnston is arguably the greatest women's player of all time despite only starting outdoor bowling in 1979. From Bellaghy, County Londonderry, she joined an indoor club and played locally for many years before joining the Ballymoney Club. In her first year of the outdoors game Johnston reached the final of the Irish Singles.

World Outdoor
Her record in the World Outdoor Bowls Championship reads as six golds, two silver and one bronze. In 1988 she was pairs champion with Phillis Nolan, silver in the singles and bronze in the team. Four years later she won the singles and pairs (with Nolan again) and a silver in the team. In 1996 she won a third consecutive pairs title with Nolan and four years later in the 2000 World Outdoor Bowls Championship she became singles Champion again. Finally in the 2004 World Outdoor Bowls Championship she won a record third singles title.

Commonwealth Games
Johnston won the pairs gold medal with Freda Elliott at the 1986 Commonwealth Games and eight years later won a second gold medal after winning the singles competition in Canada. She represented Northern Ireland ins six consecutive Commonwealth Games from 1986 until 2006. In between the two gold medal successes was a bronze medal in the singles at the 1990 Games.

Atlantic Championships
In 1997 she won the singles and pairs silver medals at the Atlantic Bowls Championships. Two years later she won the singles and triples gold medal at the Championships. Her medal haul would arguably have been greater but she refused to fund her own travel costs which the Irish Bowls authorities failed to fund.

National Championships & Other
The first Irish National Bowls Championships title came in 1983 and then she went from strength to strength creating an incredible record. She turned back the clock in 2017 when she won the fours title at the Irish National Championships.

Johnston also holds the record number for women's singles titles at the British Isles Bowls Championships, winning four in 1985, 1996, 1997 & 1999.

In addition to her World outdoor and Commonwealth titles she was also the 2004 World Singles Champion of Champions.

World Indoor
Johnston also won the 1988 World Indoor Bowls Championship title.

List of major wins
Johnson's achievements include:
1986 Commonwealth Games Pairs Champion
1988 World Indoor Bowls Championship Singles Champion
1988 World Outdoor Bowls Championship Pairs Champion
1992 World Outdoor Bowls Championship Singles Champion
1992 World Outdoor Bowls Championship Pairs Champion
1994 Commonwealth Games Singles Champion
1996 World Outdoor Bowls Championship Pairs Champion
1997 Atlantic Bowls Championships Singles Champion
1997 Atlantic Bowls Championships Pairs Champion
2000 World Outdoor Bowls Championship Singles Champion
2004 World Outdoor Bowls Championship Singles Champion

Awards and retirement
Johnston was appointed Member of the Order of the British Empire (MBE) in the 1991 New Year Honours for services to bowls. She was voted BBC Northern Ireland Sports Personality of the Year in 2004 and in 2008 announced her retirement from international bowls.

References

External links
 
 

1943 births
Living people
Female lawn bowls players from Northern Ireland
Commonwealth Games medallists in lawn bowls
Commonwealth Games gold medallists for Northern Ireland
Commonwealth Games bronze medallists for Northern Ireland
Bowls players at the 1986 Commonwealth Games
Bowls players at the 1990 Commonwealth Games
Bowls players at the 1994 Commonwealth Games
Bowls players at the 1998 Commonwealth Games
Bowls players at the 2002 Commonwealth Games
Bowls players at the 2006 Commonwealth Games
Bowls World Champions
Indoor Bowls World Champions
Bowls European Champions
Members of the Order of the British Empire
Medallists at the 1986 Commonwealth Games
Medallists at the 1990 Commonwealth Games
Medallists at the 1994 Commonwealth Games